The coat of arms of Chad was adopted in 1970. The center has a shield with jagged blue and yellow lines (barry dancetty), with  a sun rising over it. The shield is supported by a goat and a lion. Below the shield is a medal and a scroll with the national motto in French, Unité, Travail, Progrès ("Unity, Work, Progress" in English). The shield supporters as well as the scroll feature a red arrow pointing upwards.

Overview
The wavy lines on the shield symbolize Lake Chad; the crest, a rising sun, a new beginning for the country. The supporter on the left is a goat, representing the northern half of the state; the southern half is represented by the lion supporting the shield on the right. The insigne of the National Order of Chad depends from the shield.

Seal
A separate state emblem of Chad is a black-and-white seal consisting of the words "République du Tchad – Unité, Travail, Progrès" encircling a depiction of the head and upper body of a tribal girl with her hair in cornrows.

See also
Flag of Chad

References

External links

National symbols of Chad
Chad
Chad
Chad
Chad
Chad
Chad
Chad
Chad